The National Federation of Independent Business (NFIB) is an association of small businesses in the United States. It is headquartered in Nashville, Tennessee, with offices in Washington, D.C., and all 50 state capitals. The goal of NFIB is to advance the interests of small businesses.

While officially nonpartisan, it mostly endorses Republican candidates.

Politics
On its website, the National Federation of Independent Business states that it is a "nonprofit, nonpartisan organization founded in 1943". In 2010, 25 of its members, all Republican, were elected to the 112th Congress.

There has been debate about how representative of American small businesses NFIB is, noting its very conservative and pro-Republican record. Since 1990, it has donated $725,551 to Democratic candidates and party committees versus $11,972,074 to Republican candidates or party committees. It was a key opponent of President Bill Clinton's attempt to reform American health care in 1993.

In 2010, the NFIB became the lead plaintiff opposing the Patient Protection and Affordable Care Act health care reform legislation. The organization joined 26 states in the lawsuit challenging the constitutionality of the act. The case reached the Supreme Court, which issued its ruling on National Federation of Independent Business v. Sebelius on June 28, 2012, upholding most provisions of the act. Karl Rove's conservative Crossroads GPS PAC gave NFIB $3.7 million to help fund the court fight.

The NFIB supported the America's Small Business Tax Relief Act of 2014 (H.R. 4457; 113th Congress), a bill that would amend section 179 of the Internal Revenue Code, which mostly affects small- to medium-sized businesses, to retroactively and permanently extend from January 1, 2014, increased limitations on the amount of investment that can be immediately deducted from taxable income. The bill would return the tax code to its 2013 status and make the change permanent. Dan Danner, the president and CEO at that time, argued that Congress could help small business by passing the bill as it would enable small businesses to "plan for the future, invest in the economy and hire new workers."

In 2017, NFIB endorsed confirmation of SCOTUS nominee Neil Gorsuch. In 2021, it sued to oppose a COVID-19 vaccine mandate for businesses before the Supreme Court.

In fiscal year 2019, NFIB had total revenue of $97,191,251.

See also
 Union of Industrial and Employers' Confederations of Europe (UNICE, now BusinessEurope)
 European Association of Craft, Small and Medium-Sized Enterprises
 Canadian Federation of Independent Business

References

External links
National Federation of Independent Business official site

Organizations established in 1943
1943 establishments in the United States
Tea Party movement
Business organizations based in the United States
Organizations based in Nashville, Tennessee